Zona X is an  Italian comic book originally published in Italy by Sergio Bonelli Editore between 1992 and 1998. The creator of the series is Alfredo Castelli. One Zona X issue is 196 pages, which includes two complete stories or episodes. Zona X consists of a series of unusual/bizarre/fantastic stories; in the first nine issues, such stories were always unrelated to each other. Starting from volume 10, four mini-series were introduced; the writers of the series were Vincenzo Beretta (Magic Patrol), Federico Memola (La Stirpe di Elän and Legione Stellare), and Luigi Mignacco (Robinson Hart).

External links
Official site of Sergio Bonelli Editore (English)

Italian comics titles